Taylor County Courthouse in Butler, Georgia was built in 1935.  It is a Neoclassical Revival-style building that was designed by Columbus, Georgia architect Frederick Roy Duncan.  Classical elements in the design that are more prominent than usual for courthouses built during the Great Depression include its cupola, pedimented portico and entrances, quoins, and keystones.

The courthouse replaced the first courthouse of Taylor County which had been built in 1852 on the same site and which served for 80 years.  The demolition of the first courthouse by convict labor began in 1934.

It was listed on the National Register of Historic Places in 1995.

References

Courthouses on the National Register of Historic Places in Georgia (U.S. state)
Colonial Revival architecture in Georgia (U.S. state)
Neoclassical architecture in Georgia (U.S. state)
Government buildings completed in 1935
Buildings and structures in Taylor County, Georgia
County courthouses in Georgia (U.S. state)
National Register of Historic Places in Taylor County, Georgia